Giuseppe Sartore (31 March 1937 – 30 May 1995) was an Italian racing cyclist. He won stage 19 of the 1962 Giro d'Italia.

References

External links
 

1937 births
1995 deaths
Italian male cyclists
Italian Giro d'Italia stage winners
Place of birth missing
Cyclists from the Province of Pavia